Amata pfeifferae is a species of moth in the family Erebidae first described by Frederic Moore in 1859. It is found on Sumatra and Java.

References

Moths described in 1858
pfeifferae
Moths of Asia